Southtown Center, colloquially known as Southtown, is a regional shopping mall in Bloomington, Minnesota, a suburb of the Twin Cities. The center contains 38 retail tenants and is anchored by AMF Bowling Centers, Bed Bath & Beyond (closing), Kohl's, and TJ Maxx.

The first phase of Southtown Center opened on November 3, 1960, with two more phases proceeding in 1963 and 1964. The mall is partially enclosed, while the majority of the center contains open air structures. Several additional buildings were constructed on the property throughout the years, while minimal renovations took place to maintain the mall's appearance.

History

1960–62: Construction, grand opening, and additions
Southtown Center opened on November 3, 1960 in Bloomington, Minnesota and became Bloomington's "first regional shopping center". The center was developed by Kraus-Anderson, Inc., a Bloomington-based construction firm, with founder Lloyd Engelsma taking over as the site's project manager. According to Engelsma, Southtown was built atop "a strip of cow pasture" near a busy intersection in Bloomington, taking up nearly 37 acres of land; Engelsma had "high expectations for the new center." During construction of the mall, three labor strikes occurred which heavily delayed construction; unideal and inclement weather created further setbacks during the construction. Montgomery Ward, a Chicago-based department store, announced that they would be opening up a location at Southtown, and became the mall's only anchor; Ward filled a  building, the largest Ward department store in the United States.

After the center's opening, several additions took place at the mall. During 1963, a  AMF Bowling Center was constructed on the north side of the property; the bowling alley is still currently in use today. In 1964, a Mann Theatres was constructed on the property; Southtown Mann Theatre became the first movie theater to be attached to a shopping center in the Twin Cities. However, the cinema was completely remodeled in 1980, removing some its original decor, before being torn down in 1995 to make way for additional retail.

1998–present: Store closings and rezoning
Montgomery Ward prospered as Southtown's largest tenant until 1998, when Ward announced that they would be closing nine underperforming locations as part of their "ongoing operations and strategic initiatives to return to profitability." Filling Ward's vacancy was Herberger's, a Minnesota department store, who had agreed to purchase several other closed Montgomery Ward stores in the Twin Cities area. Toys "R" Us agreed to lease the other side of the Ward store that Herberger's hadn't leased.

In September 2014, several plans were created by the city of Bloomington in order to rezone several parts of the shopping center. However, Southtown's owner, Kraus-Anderson, stated that the rezoning would "threaten Southtown's existence and that customers like things how they are." Several Bloomington locals and customers of Southtown created a website to persuade the city of Bloomington not to continue with any redeveloping plans. Despite the creation of the website and Kraus-Anderson's frustration and concern during the proposed redevelopment, the city council approved the project in July 2015. In April of the same year, Southtown's  Toys "R" Us closed after their 26-year lease expired. Despite this closing, Southtown Center has maintained a 99 percent occupancy rate for many years.

On April 18, 2018, it was announced that Herberger's would be closing as parent company The Bon-Ton Stores was going out of business. The store closed on August 29, 2018.

References

External links
 
 Southtown Center 'Next' site Site created to avoid redevelopment of the center

Buildings and structures in Bloomington, Minnesota
Minneapolis–Saint Paul
Shopping malls established in 1960
Shopping malls in Hennepin County, Minnesota
Shopping malls in Minnesota
Tourist attractions in Hennepin County, Minnesota